R361 road may refer to:
 R361 road (Ireland)
 R361 road (South Africa)